The 1986–87 season is FC Barcelona's 88th season in existence and the club's 56th consecutive season in the top flight of Spanish football.

Squad
Correct as of 09 March 2019.

La Liga

Regular season table

Championship group table

Results
Source:

Statistics

Players statistics

References

External links

webdelcule.com

FC Barcelona seasons
Barcelona